A position of trust is any position that requires its holder to enjoy the trust of those who elected or chose the holder. It is often used in a more restricted sense defined by an organization or by legislation.

One possible legal summary of a Position of Trust is a paid or volunteer position with one or more of the following responsibilities: access to vulnerable populations, property access, financial/fiduciary duty or executive positions.

According to one common definition, it is any position that has responsibility for "cash, keys, or kids (minors)". The concept of "keys" refers to security, including IT security and management.

According to another common definition, it is any position of authority over another person or within an organization, for example as a supervisor.

Crimes committed by a person in a position of trust may be penalized more severely under the law, and those wishing to occupy positions of trust may be subject to special restrictions such as background checks.

Parties involved
A typical position of trust at the personal level involves child custody or power of attorney. The same would be true for the five standard professions; medicine, law, finance, education and engineering. Any regulated profession dealing with the health and safety of others usually requires certification and licensing and would be a position of trust. The same would be true in the hierarchy of relationships involved in education, employment, financial matters and government.

Sexual relations
In the United Kingdom, the Sexual Offences Act 2000 prohibits a person in a position of trust from performing sexual acts with someone who cannot consent, which includes minors and "very vulnerable people". This is primarily used for the protection of young people who are above the age of consent but under the age of 18 and for the protection of people with mental disabilities. Only after a person is no longer in a position of trust may they pursue a sexual relationship with a person previously entrusted to them. Similarly, molestation by a person in a position of trust is also a criminal offence in Singapore punishable by imprisonment.

In the Netherlands, incest itself is not prosecutable, but if an adult commits incest with a family member that is a minor, the adult can be prosecuted for abusing his/her position of trust. The adult family member does not have to be biologically related to the minor to be prosecutable for this offence. The relevant legislation also applies to adults who are family members only by marriage.

See also
 Conflict of interest
 Misplaced loyalty
 Profession
 Professional abuse
 Professional ethics
 Professional responsibility
 Supervisor

References

External links
 As defined in UK laws on sex offenses
 As defined in US law

Legal ethics
Legal terminology